Captain William Lowden (born circa 1740 – died 20 February 1820) was an early shipbuilder and pioneer of Pictou, Nova Scotia. With his sons, he built the first shipyard in Pictou in 1788. For his achievements, he is considered to be the father of shipbuilding in Pictou.

Early life
Lowden was born in Dumfriesshire, Scotland, and lived in the parish of Caerlaverock in 1766 when his sons Robert and Samuel were born. He began his career as a merchant in the 1760s, trading with Russia and also carrying convicts to Virginia. In the 1770s, he began to trade with the newly founded town of Pictou. On one of these visits, in 1777, his ship (Molly) was captured by American privateers from Machias, Maine:

The privateers took the ship and most of its crew to Baie Verte, New Brunswick. Lowden was released, and went to Charlottetown in a canoe, eventually joining the crew of a man-of-war in pursuit of the Americans. When the ship reached Baie Verte, the privateers abandoned the Molly, and Waugh was forced to flee to Tatamagouche, Nova Scotia.

Move to Pictou
In 1788, Lowden moved to Pictou with his children William, Robert, Elizabeth, Thomas, and David. He first settled at the East River, and built a windmill and a shipyard—the first shipyard in Pictou—at a site that was later called Windmill Point. However, he soon left this site and moved to Pictou town. According to George Patterson,

His most famous ship was the Harriet (1798), at 600 tons the largest and finest ship built in Nova Scotia at the time. David Lowden, William's son, was the captain on the Harriet'''s maiden voyage, in which a French privateer approached but did not attack because the ship seemed heavily armed. Lowden's other ships included the Prince Edward (1798) and the Enterprise'' (1820; built by William and his son Thomas).

Family
His wife was named Nichola McMorine or Morrin. They had at least seven children; Margaret (1761 Irongray, Kirkcudbrightshire-?), William Jr (?-1838 Pictou), David (1763 Dumfriesshire-1839 Pictou), Samuel (1766 Caerlaverock-?), Robert (1766 Caerlaverock-1843 Merigomish, Nova Scotia), Elizabeth (1770 Dumfriesshire-1840 Pictou), and Thomas (1772 Dumfries-shire-1845 Pictou).

See also
Pictou Shipyard

References

1820 deaths
People from Pictou County
Scottish emigrants to pre-Confederation Nova Scotia
People from Dumfries and Galloway
Year of birth uncertain